300 is the soundtrack to the 2007 film 300. It was composed by Tyler Bates and was released on March 6, 2007, three days before the film opened for public viewing.

Production and composition 
In July 2005, composer Tyler Bates began work on the film, describing the score as having "beautiful themes on the top and large choir," but "tempered with some extreme heaviness." The composer had scored for a test scene that the director wanted to show to Warner Bros. to illustrate the path of the project. Bates said that the score had "a lot of weight and intensity in the low end of the percussion" that Snyder found agreeable to the film. The score was recorded at Abbey Road Studios and features the vocals of Azam Ali. A standard edition and a special edition of the soundtrack containing 25 tracks was released on March 6, 2007, with the special edition containing a 16-page booklet and three two-sided trading cards.

The lyrics sung are in Bulgarian, Greek and Latin. The opening lines of the track "Come and Get Them" are "Ferto! – Parte to!" translating as "bring it! – take it!". It is said that Leonidas exclaimed Molōn Labe! when asked by Xerxes to surrender their weapons, which is translated into English as "Come and Get Them".

Track listing 
 "To Victory" – 2:33
 "The Agoge" – 2:24
 "The Wolf" – 2:09
 "Returns a King" – 2:23
 "Submission" – 2:39
 "The Ephors" – 1:58
 "Cursed by Beauty" – 1:40
 "What Must a King Do?" – 1:04
 "Goodbye My Love" – 3:21
 "No Sleep Tonight" – 2:32
 "Tree of the Dead" – 2:23
 "The Hot Gates" – 2:59
 "Fight in the Shade" – 3:16
 "Come And Get Them" – 2:04
 "No Mercy" – 2:22
 "Immortals Battle" – 1:52
 "Fever Dream" – 2:32
 "Xerxes' Tent" – 3:19
 "Tonight We Dine in Hell" – 1:13
 "The Council Chamber" – 2:33
 "Xerxes' Final Offer" – 2:37
 "A God King Bleeds" – 2:16
 "Glory" – 1:43
 "Message for the Queen" 
 "Remember Us" – 2:56

Copyright issues
The score was criticized for its similarity to other then-recent soundtracks, including James Horner and Gabriel Yared's work for the film Troy. The heaviest borrowings were said to be from Elliot Goldenthal's 1999 score for Titus. "Remember Us," from 300, is identical in parts to the "Finale" from Titus, and "Returns a King" is similar to the cue "Victorius Titus". On August 3, 2007, Warner Bros. Pictures acknowledged in an official statement:

Reception
Upon its release, the 300 soundtrack received mostly negative reviews from film music reviewers, largely due to the Goldenthal plagiarism. Christian Clemmensen of Filmtracks.com refused to review the album upon its release, later giving the album one star and quoting Bates as saying "I have as much respect for a garbage can lid as I do for the orchestra. Both of them can be entirely useful and important in the scope of a movie, if you look at them the right way." Clemmensen responds "That's a wise statement, but it's completely irrelevant unless you can actually use that garbage can lid in a manner that doesn't break the law.".

The soundtrack debuted at #74 on the Billboard Top 200 and rose to #52 in its second week. It has sold 37,638 copies to date.

References 

Adaptations of works by Frank Miller
2007 soundtrack albums
Warner Records soundtracks
Albums involved in plagiarism controversies
Tyler Bates soundtracks
Action film soundtracks